James Crews was a Virginian in the 17th century and an associate of Bacon during Bacon's Rebellion, unanimously elected burgess by the freemen of Henrico County during said rebellion.

References

Henrico County, Virginia
People from Virginia
17th-century American people